The Bell P-63 Kingcobra is an American fighter aircraft that was developed by Bell Aircraft during World War II. Based on the preceding Bell P-39 Airacobra, the P-63's design incorporated suggestions from P-39 pilots and was superior to its predecessor in virtually all respects. The P-63 was not accepted for combat use by the United States Army Air Forces. However, it was used during World War II by the Soviet Air Force, which had also been the most prolific user of the P-39.

Design and development

XP-39E
While the P-39 had been introduced as an interceptor, later in its development it was decided to reduce the cost and complexity of the engine by removing the turbocharger. High-altitude performance suffered dramatically as a result, and Bell proposed an experimental series to test out a variety of solutions.

The resulting XP-39E featured two primary changes from the earlier P-39D from which it was developed. One was a redesigned wing. The root airfoil, a NACA 0015 on other models of the P-39, was changed to a NACA 0018, to gain internal volume. The other was a switch to the Continental I-1430 engine, which featured an improved overall design developed from the hyper engine efforts, as well as an improved supercharger.

Three prototypes were ordered in April 1941 with serials 41-19501, 41-19502 and 42-7164. The I-1430 had continued development problems and could not be delivered in time, so it was replaced by an Allison V-1710-47, similar to that powering the P-39. Each prototype tested different wing and tail configurations: 41-19501 had a rounded vertical tail, but squared-off tailplane tips; 41-19502, a squared-off fin and rudder and large wing fillets; and 42-7164 had all its flight surfaces squared off. However, the XP-39E was considered inferior to the stock P-39 Airacobra in all other respects, so it was not ordered into production.

XP-63

Although the XP-39E proved disappointing, the USAAF was nevertheless interested in an even larger aircraft based on the same basic layout. Even before its first flight, the USAAF placed an order on 27 June 1941 for two prototypes of an enlarged version powered by the same V-1710-47. The new design was given the designation XP-63 and serials were 41-19511 and 41-19512. A third prototype was also ordered, 42-78015, using the Packard V-1650, the U.S.-built version of the Rolls-Royce Merlin engine.

The XP-63 was larger in all dimensions than the Airacobra. The wing was redesigned again, this time with new NACA laminar flow airfoils, 66(215)-116 a=0.6 at the root and a NACA 66(215)-216 a=0.6 at the tip. The engine was fitted with a second remotely mounted supercharger, supplementing the normal single-stage supercharger. At higher altitudes, when additional boost was required, a hydraulic clutch would engage the second supercharger, adding  to the service ceiling. A larger four-bladed propeller was also standardized. A persistent complaint about the Airacobra was that its nose armament was not easily accessible for ground maintenance; to cure this problem the XP-63 airframe was fitted with larger cowling panels.

In September 1942, even before the prototype flew, the USAAF ordered it into production as the P-63A (Model 33). The P-63A's armament was to be the same as the current P-39Q, a single  M4 cannon firing through the propeller hub, two synchronized  machine guns in the cowl, and two  machine guns in underwing gondolas.

The first prototype, 41-19511, flew for the first time on 7 December 1942. It was destroyed on 28 January 1943 when its landing gear failed to extend. The second prototype, 41-19512, followed on 5 February 1943. It, too, was destroyed, this time due to an engine failure.

Deliveries of production P-63As began in October 1943. The USAAF concluded the Kingcobra was inferior to the Mustang, and declined to order larger quantities. American allies, particularly the Soviet Union, had a great need for fighter aircraft, however, and the Soviets were already the largest users of the Airacobra. Therefore, the Kingcobra was ordered into production to be delivered under Lend-Lease. In February 1944, the Soviet government sent a highly experienced test pilot, Andrey G. Kochetkov, and an aviation engineer, Fyodor P. Suprun, to the Bell factories to participate in the development of the first production variant, the P-63A. Initially ignored by Bell engineers, Kochetkov's expert testing of the machine's spin characteristics (which led to airframe buckling) eventually led to a significant Soviet role in the development. After flat spin recovery proved impossible, and upon Kochetkov's making a final recommendation that pilots should bail out upon entering such a spin, he received a commendation from the Irving Parachute Company. The Kingcobra's maximum aft CG was moved forward to facilitate recovery from spins.

P-63A-8, SN 269261, was extensively tested at TsAGI in what was then the world's largest wind tunnel. Soviet input was significant. With the Soviet Union being the largest buyer of the aircraft, Bell was quick to implement their suggestions. Most of the changes in the A sub-variants were a direct result of Soviet input, e.g. increased pilot armor and fuselage hardpoint on the A-5, underwing hardpoints and extra fuel tanks on the A-6, etc. The Soviet Union even experimented with ski landing gear for the P-63A-6, but this never reached production. Most significantly, Soviet input resulted in moving the main cannon forward, favorably changing the center of gravity, and increasing its ammunition load from 30 to 58 rounds for the A-9 variant.

Swept-wing L-39

After the war, two war surplus P-63Cs were modified by Bell under Navy contract for flight testing of low-speed and stall characteristics of high-speed wing designs. The aircraft received new wings with adjustable leading edge slats, trailing edge flaps and a pronounced sweep of 35 degrees. The wings had no wheel wells; only the nose gear was retractable. L-39-1 first flew 23 April 1946, demonstrating a need for extra tail surface and rear fuselage length to balance the aircraft in flight—the wing repositioning reduced empennage effectiveness and moved the center of lift aft. A lighter three-bladed propeller from a P-39Q-10 was mounted and the necessary changes to the empennage were made. L-39-2 incorporated these adjustments from the start. L-39-1 later went to NACA at Langley for wind tunnel testing, where much valuable data was gathered. L-39-2 also served as a testbed for the Bell X-2 40-degree wing design.

Operational service

Soviet Union 
The first version to be supplied in quantity to the Soviet Union was the P-63A-7 with a higher vertical tail, and reinforced wings and fuselage. The fuselage proved to need strengthening; consequently, in October 1944 a reinforcement kit for operational P-63s was developed.

Air Transport Command ferry pilots, including U.S. women pilots of the WASP program, picked up the planes at the Bell factory at Niagara Falls, New York, and flew them to Great Falls, Montana and then onward via the Northwest Staging Route through Canada to Alaska, where Soviet ferry pilots, many of them also women, would take delivery of the aircraft at Nome and fly them to the Soviet Union over the Bering Strait via the Alaska-Siberia route (ALSIB). A total of 2,397 (2,672, according to other sources) aircraft were delivered to the USSR, 72.6% of the overall 3,303 production aircraft.

By a 1943 agreement, P-63s were not allowed for Soviet use against Germany and were supposed to be concentrated in the Soviet Far East for an eventual attack on Japan. However, there are many unconfirmed reports from both Soviet and German sources that P-63s did indeed see service against the Luftwaffe. In memoirs published in the 1990s, one of Pokryshkin's pilots reported that the entire 4th Guards Fighter Aviation Regiment (4 GvIAP) was secretly converted to P-63s in 1944, while officially still flying P-39s. One account states they were in action at Königsberg, in Poland and in the final assault on Berlin.  There are German reports of P-63s shot down by both fighters and flak. Hans Rudel, the most-decorated pilot of the Luftwaffe, states in his memoirs, "We often encounter American types of aircraft, especially Airacobras, Kingcobras and Bostons." This was in the Courland front towards the end of the war. Nevertheless, all Soviet records show nothing but P-39s used against Germany.

In general, official Soviet histories played down the role of Lend-Lease supplied aircraft in favor of local designs, but it is known that the P-63 was a successful fighter aircraft in Soviet service. A common Western misconception is that the Bell fighters were used as ground attack aircraft.

The Soviets developed successful group aerial fighting tactics for the Bell fighters and scored a surprising number of aerial victories over a variety of German aircraft. Low ceilings, short missions, good radios, a sealed and warm cockpit and ruggedness contributed to their effectiveness. To pilots who had once flown the tricky Polikarpov I-16, the aerodynamic quirks of the mid-engined aircraft were unimportant. In the Far East, P-63 and P-39 aircraft were used in the Soviet invasion of Manchukuo and northern Korea. In the Pacific theatre, the Kingcobras flew escort, close air support and ground attack missions. The Soviet P-63s achieved their first air victory on 15 August 1945, when Lejtenant I. F. Miroshnichenko from 17th IAP/190 IAD, shot down a Nakajima Ki-43 Hayabusa IJAAS fighter off the coast of North Korea.

Sufficient aircraft continued in use after the war for them to be given the NATO reporting name of Fred. By 9 May 1945, operational units still had 1,148 Kingcobras on strength. Soviet sources say the attack was intentional, but the pilots claimed it was a result of a navigational error. The airfield belonged to the Air Forces of the Pacific Fleet (VVS TOF), but it was occupied by the 821st Fighter Aviation Regiment (821 IAP) of the 190th Fighter Aviation Division (190 IAD). Mostly aircraft of the 1st Squadron of 821 IAP were hit with 12 P-63s damaged, one P-63 burned to the ground while the other damaged aircraft were able to be repaired. There were no human losses.

France

In 1945, 114 later models were delivered to the French Air Force (Armée de l'Air), but they arrived too late to see service in World War II. They did see service during the First Indochina War before being replaced in 1951.

Initially, the French Kingcobras were deployed to Algeria. Fighter squadron (Groupe de Chasse) 2/6 "Travail", previously equipped with P-39 Airacobras, received their Kingcobras on 18 July at Casablanca; the pilots were surprised by the higher landing speed of their new aircraft. The Kingcobra were scrambled to Indochina when the insurgency broke. Only 60 Kingcobras were operational in Indochina in January 1950, mainly because the Americans refused to supply spare parts. Starting in February 1951, the squadrons equipped with Kingcobra started to receive Grumman F8F Bearcats as replacements. Most Kingcobras were mothballed by July. The last flight of a Kingcobra in Indochina took place on 6 September 1951.

"Pinball" operations
Its main use in American service was the unusual one of a manned flying target for gunnery practice. The aircraft was generally painted bright orange to increase its visibility. All armament and the regular armor was removed from these RP-63 aircraft, and over a ton of armored sheet metal was applied to the aircraft. This was fitted with sensors that would detect hits, and these hits were signaled by illuminating a light in the propeller hub where the cannon would have been. This earned the aircraft the unofficial nickname of Pinball. Special frangible rounds made of a lead/Bakelite combination were developed that would disintegrate upon impact. These were known as the "Cartridge, Caliber .30, Frangible, Ball, M22". In 1990, veteran Pinball pilot, Ivan L. Hickman, wrote Operation Pinball about the training flights.

RAE Testing
British engineers, like the Americans, had a growing interest during World War II in the application of laminar flow airfoils. In an effort to learn more about the practical application of laminar flow airfoils, in 1945 the Royal Aircraft Establishment (RAE) undertook a flight test program with one of the two P-63As that the United Kingdom had received. The aircraft was equipped with a wake rake array mounted outboard, behind the wing, to allow the momentum deficit, and thus section drag, to be measured.

The RAE first tested it in an "as delivered" configuration. The wing airfoil was designed to support laminar flow to 60% of chord. In the "as delivered" configuration, a profile drag was measured which was representative of the wing section with boundary layer transition at the leading edge (0% laminar flow). Reducing the surface roughness reduced the drag at low lift coefficients to a level representative of laminar flow to 35% of chord. Measurements were made of the surface waviness. The standard waviness criteria shows the critical wave height to be  for this application. To reduce the waviness, RAE personnel stripped the wing to bare metal. The wing was then sprayed with two coats of primer paint and a coat of paint type filler. After the paint was dry, it was sanded in a chordwise direction, using sanding blocks whose curvature matched the local surface curvature. This was repeated several times. In flight, this configuration was found to have a profile drag representative of boundary layer transition at 60% of chord. This gave researchers an idea of what level of wing surface quality was required to actually get the benefits of laminar flow airfoils.

Postwar air racers
Numerous surplus P-63s ended up on the air racing circuit in the immediate postwar era. Charles Tucker purchased two P-63s from the disposal facility at Kingman, Arizona just after the war. He entered one of them, the Tucker Special as Race 28 with the name Flying Red Horse emblazoned on the nose (civilian register N62995) in the 1946 Thompson Trophy race. The second one (44-4126 (XN63231 Race 30)) was intended for the 1946 Bendix cross country race. It was initially fitted with two wingtip drop tanks.

Two other significant racers were flown later. Tipsy Miss, John Sandberg's clipped-wingtip P-63 unlimited racer, was identified as "Race 28," and painted in bright orange, white and black race numbers with a chrome spinner. Later sold to a European pilot, this P-63 was destroyed in a fatal accident in 1990 Crazy Horse Campgrounds was the most radically modified P-63 Kingcobra ever. Larry Haven's "Race 90" clipped-wing unlimited racer had a tiny bubble canopy installed; it appeared in all silver (unpolished aluminum) finish with a white rudder and black trim. The aircraft later crashed into the ocean on a test flight in 1972.

Variants

XP-63 Prototypes (two) (company designation was Model 24); USAAF serials (41-19511 and 41-19512).
XP-63A Following the loss of the first two prototypes, an additional test aircraft was procured, USAAF serial 42-78015, originally ordered as a testbed for the proposed Rolls-Royce Merlin-powered P-63B.
P-63A The production model Bell Model 33; 1725 P-63As produced in various sub-marks.
P-63B Proposed Rolls-Royce Merlin-powered P-63B series was cancelled due to lack of availability of Merlin engines.
A total production run of 1,227 was completed.
The series was cancelled in 1945.
P-63E Essentially similar to the P-63D with the exception of a ventral fin extension and the use of a standard "cab"-style cockpit; only 13 built.
P-63F Bell Model 43 variant featured an enlarged vertical tail and Allison V-1710-135; only two (43-11719 and 43-11722) built.
RP-63A/C "Pinball" Target aircraft with five modified from P-63As and 95 modified on production lines; in 1948, surviving RP-63A aircraft were redesignated QF-63A. A further 200 production RP-63C aircraft were modified on the production line. Similarly, the surviving RP-63Cs were redesignated QF-63Cs. Many of the "target" aircraft were actually used as target tugs.

RP-63G "Pinball" "Dedicated" flying targets which included two prototypes (43-11723 and 11724) and 30 production aircraft that incorporated a flush dorsal inlet but, more significantly, lights that would come on when the target was struck with frangible munitions. In 1948, the remaining RP-63Gs were redesignated QF-63Gs.
L-39 Two war surplus P-63Cs modified by Bell under Navy contract for flight testing of low-speed and stall characteristics of high-speed wing designs.

Operators

 French Air Force

 Honduran Air Force (post-war)

 Soviet Air Force

 Royal Aircraft Establishment (two P-63As for evaluation)

 United States Army Air Forces

Survivors

Honduras
On display
P-63E
43-11730: Museo Del Aire, Toncontin International Airport, Tegucigalpa.

Russia
On display
P-63A
42-68875: Russian Air Force Museum, Moscow.

P-63C
44-4011: Museum of the Great Patriotic War in Moscow.

United Kingdom
Under restoration
P-63C
 43-11137: under restoration at the Wings Museum, Balcombe, West Sussex.  The museum also has 5 other P-63 airframes.

United States
Airworthy
P-63A
42-68864 Pretty Polly: Palm Springs Air Museum in Palm Springs, California.
42-68941 TEST: Commemorative Air Force (previously Dixie Wing; after 2020, Airbase Georgia) in Peachtree City, Georgia.
42-69080 Fatal Fang: Yanks Air Museum in Chino, California.
P-63C
43-11223: Legacy of Flight Museum in Rexburg, Idaho. (Painted as P-63A-6/42-69021).

On display
P-63A
42-70609: Military Aviation Museum in Virginia Beach, Virginia.
P-63E
43-11727: Pima Air & Space Museum in Tucson, Arizona. It is on loan from the National Museum of the United States Air Force at Wright-Patterson AFB in Dayton, Ohio.
RP-63G
45-57295: Lackland AFB, Texas.
Under restoration or in storage
P-63A
42-70255 Edyth Louise: in storage at the Paul Garber Facility of the National Air and Space Museum in Silver Hill, Maryland.
RP-63C
43-11117: in storage at Fantasy of Flight in Polk City, Florida.
P-63E
43-11728: in storage at the National Museum of the United States Air Force at Wright-Patterson AFB in Dayton, Ohio.

Accidents and incidents 
On 3 June 2001, a Bell P-63A crashed during the Biggin Hill International Air Fair in London, England, killing the pilot. The pilot was at the top of a vertical maneuver when he appeared to have lost control of the plane. This was the second plane accident in 24 hours at Biggin Hill following the crash of a de Havilland Vampire that killed both pilots.

On 12 November 2022, P-63F 43-11719, owned by the Commemorative Air Force, collided with Boeing B-17G Flying Fortress Texas Raiders at an airshow in Dallas, Texas. 43-11719 was one of only five remaining airworthy P-63s and was one of the only P-63F variants ever built. Six people were killed, one in the P-63 and five in the B-17.

Specifications (P-63A)

See also
 Hazel Ying Lee

References

Notes

Bibliography
 Angelucci, Enzo and Paolo Matricardi. World Aircraft: World War II, Volume II (Sampson Low Guides). Maidenhead, UK: Sampson Low, 1978. .
 Bridgman, Leonard, ed. "The Bell Kingcobra." Jane's Fighting Aircraft of World War II. London: Studio, 1946, p. 207. .
 Dean, Francis H. America's Hundred Thousand. Atglen, Pennsylvania: Schiffer Publishing Ltd., 1997. .
 Dorr, Robert F. "Bell Cobra Variants: P-39 Airacobra and P-63 Kingcobra" Wings of Fame, Vol. 10, 1998.
 Gordon, Yefim. Soviet Air Power in World War 2. Hinckley, Lancashire, UK: Midland, Ian Allan Publishing, 2008. .
 Green, William. War Planes of the Second World War, Volume Four: Fighters. London: MacDonald & Co. (Publishers) Ltd., Sixth impression 1969, first edition 1961. .
 Green, William and Gordon Swanborough. WW2 Aircraft Fact Files: US Army Air Force Fighters, Part 1. London: Macdonald and Jane's Publishers Ltd., 1977. .
 Hardesty, Von. Red Phoenix: The Rise of Soviet Air Power 1941-1945. Washington, D.C.: Smithsonian Institution, 1991, First edition 1982. .
 Hickman, Ivan. Operation Pinball: The USAAF's Secret Aerial Gunnery Program in WWII. St. Paul, Minnesota: Motorbooks International, 1990. .
 Jane, Fred T. "The Bell Kingcobra." Jane's Fighting Aircraft of World War II. London: Studio, 1946. .
 Johnsen, Frederick A. Bell P-39/P-63 Airacobra & Kingcobra. St. Paul, Minnesota: Voyageur Press,  .

 Lednicer, David A. "Aerodynamics of the Bell P-39 Airacobra and P-63 Kingcobra". SAE paper 2000-01-167. Warrendale, Pennsylvania: SAE International, 9 May 2000.
 Long, Everett A. and Ivan Y. Neganblya. Cobras over the Tundra (bilingual Russian/English). Reno, Nevada: Arktika, 2nd edition 2001, 1992. .
 Matthews, Birch. Cobra! Bell Aircraft Corporation 1934-1946. Atglen, PA: Schiffer Publishing, 1996. .
 Pelletier, Alain J. "French 'Kings': Bell P-63 Kingcobras in Indochina" Air Enthusiast, No 72, 1997.
 Smith, F. and D.J. Higton. "Flight Tests of "King Cobra" FZ.440 to Investigate the Practical Requirements for the Achievement of Low Profile Drag Coefficients on a "Low Drag" Aerofoil." Aeronautical Research Council R&M 2375, August 1945.
 Tomalik, Jacek. Bell P-39 Airacobra Cz.1, Monografie Lotnicze 58 (in Polish). Gdańsk, Poland: AJ-Press, 1999. .
 Tomalik, Jacek. Bell P-63 Kingcobra, XFL-1 Airabonita, P-39 Airacobra Cz.2, Monografie Lotnicze 59 (in Polish). Gdańsk, Poland: AJ-Press, 2001. .
 Petit, Jean-Jacques. "Le Kingcobra en Indochine", Aviation Francaise Magazine No. 1 (Dec 2004/Jan 2005), pp. 4–21.
 Williams, Anthony G. Rapid Fire: The Development of Automatic Cannon, Heavy Machine-Guns and Their Ammunition for Armies, Navies and Air Forces. Shrewsbury, UK: Airlife, 2002. .

External links

Data
 Commemorative Air Force restoration of P-63 42-68941
 Contemporary report on Kingcobra in Flight 1944
 National Museum of the United States Air Force Fact Sheets: Bell P-63 Kingcobra
Photos
 Walkaround P-63 Kingcobra from Monino Museum, Russia
 Photo of Larry Haven's 'Race 90" at warbirdaeropress.com
 Photo of Charles Tucker's Race 30 with the  wings from airrace.com
 Gallery of photos in French service

P-063
Mid-engined aircraft
Soviet Union–United States relations
1940s United States fighter aircraft
Single-engined tractor aircraft
Low-wing aircraft
Aircraft first flown in 1942